Brumel may refer to:

 Antoine Brumel (c.1460–c.1515), Franco-Flemish Renaissance composer 
 Jacques Brunel  (died 1564), also known as Giaches Brumel, 16th century French organist and composer
 Valeriy Brumel (1942–2003), Soviet-Russian athlete in the high jump, and writer

See also 
 Beau Brummell